Florian Stahel (born 10 March 1985) is a retired footballer from Switzerland.

Career

Stahel signed for FC Zurich playing against Grasshopper Zurich's youth academy and scoring an individual goal in a 2–6 loss.

In July 2016, he signed a two-year contract with FC Wohlen.

Honours
FC Zürich
Swiss Cup: 2004–05
Super League/Nationalliga A: 2005–06, 2006–07, 2008–09

References

1985 births
Living people
Swiss men's footballers
Switzerland youth international footballers
Swiss Super League players
Swiss Challenge League players
FC Zürich players
FC Luzern players
FC Vaduz players
Swiss expatriate footballers
Swiss expatriate sportspeople in Liechtenstein
Expatriate footballers in Liechtenstein
FC Wohlen players
Association football defenders